Roger Creager (born July 25, 1971) is an American Texas country music singer and songwriter from Corpus Christi, Texas.

Biography
Creager aspired to become a country music singer since he was six years old. He started learning how to play piano in the second grade and began to learn guitar as a student at Tuloso-Midway High School. After high school, he attended Sam Houston State University and earned a degree in business. He then went to Texas A&M University in College Station to earn a degree in agriculture. In College Station, the Texas Music Revolution helped him become a musician.

In August 2006, Creager traveled to Africa and climbed Mount Kilimanjaro. In the summer of 2007, Creager traveled to France to take part in the Festival Country Rendez-Vous.

Creager married his wife Chelsey, in Ireland, November 20, 2021, with a stateside ceremony on November 28, 2021. The couple share a daughter, Audrey Rose, born March 9, 2021.

Creager lives in Houston, Texas.

Band members

Allen Huff (Huff Daddy) – piano, organ, accordion, vocals
Jason Broussard – drums
Bryce Clarke – lead guitar, acoustic guitar
Stormy Cooper – bass guitar
Aleph Yonker – fiddle, lead guitar, vocals

Roger's father and brother, Bill and Randy Creager, occasionally join him onstage providing vocals on songs such as "Rancho Grande" and "Please Come to Boston".

Discography

Albums

Extended plays

Music videos

Popular songs

"The Everclear Song" (written by Mike Ethan Messick and released on the 1998 album Having Fun All Wrong)
"Fun All Wrong" (on the 1998 album Having Fun All Wrong)
"I Got The Guns" (on the 2000 album I Got the Guns)
"Love" (on the 2000 album I Got the Guns)
"Rancho Grande" (on the 2000 album I Got the Guns)
"Things Look Good Around Here" (on the 2000 album I Got the Guns)
"Long Way To Mexico" (on the 2003 album  Long Way to Mexico)
"Love Is Crazy"  (on the 2003 album  Long Way to Mexico)
"Love Is So Sweet"
"A Good Day for Sunsets"
"I'm From The Beer Joint"
"Bad Friend to a Good Man"

References

External links
Roger Creager official website

American country singer-songwriters
People from Corpus Christi, Texas
People from Katy, Texas
Texas A&M University alumni
Singer-songwriters from Texas
1971 births
Living people
Country musicians from Texas
21st-century American singers